Ailanthus integrifolia, white siris, is a tree in the family Simaroubaceae. The specific epithet  is from the Latin meaning "entire leaves", referring to the leaflet margins.

Description
The smooth bark is light brown or grey.

Distribution and habitat
Ailanthus integrifolia grows naturally in India, Vietnam, Malesia and Papuasia. Its main habitat is primary rainforest from sea-level to  altitude.

References

integrifolia
Flora of tropical Asia
Taxonomy articles created by Polbot